Breaker is an outdoor sculpture by David Evans Black, installed on the Ohio State University campus in Columbus, Ohio, United States.

Desctiption and history
The abstract aluminum plate sculpture, which measures approximately  x , was commissioned in December 1980 and dedicated on July 9, 1982. It cost $30,000–35,000, and Allied Fabricating and Welding Company served as the fabricator. The sculpture was originally installed near Mershon Auditorium, but was relocated on June 5, 1985, to the southeast corner of College Rd. and W. 18th Ave. because of construction of the Wexner Center for the Arts. The Smithsonian Institution describes the work as "a white twisting metal sculpture symbolizing the ocean's waves breaking on the shore". It was surveyed by Smithsonian's "Save Outdoor Sculpture!" program in 1993.

See also

 1982 in art

References

External links
 Breaker at Columbus Makes Art, Greater Columbus Arts Council

1982 establishments in Ohio
1982 sculptures
Abstract sculptures in the United States
Aluminum sculptures in Ohio
Ohio State University
Outdoor sculptures in Columbus, Ohio
Relocated buildings and structures in Ohio